La Belle Assemblée (in full La Belle Assemblée or, Bell's Court and Fashionable Magazine Addressed Particularly to the Ladies) was a British women's magazine published from 1806 to 1837, founded by John Bell (1745–1831).

Publishing history
The magazine was published as La Belle Assemblée from 1806 until May 1832. It became The Court Magazine and Belle Assemblée from 1832 to 1837.  After 1837 the Belle Assemblée name was dropped when the magazine merged with the Lady's Magazine and Museum (itself a merger of The Lady's Magazine and a competitor) to become The Court Magazine and Monthly Critic.

It was published by John Bell from 1806 until his retirement in 1821, and by G. & W. Whittaker & Co. from 1823 to 1829.  Between these dates the magazine was listed as "Published for the proprietors".

Content
La Belle Assemblée is now best known for its fashion plates of Regency era styles, but until the 1820s it also published original poetry and fiction, non-fiction articles on politics and science, book and theatre reviews, and serialized novels, including Oakwood Hall by Catherine Hutton.  Other notable contributors to La Belle Assemblée include Mary Shelley.  Contributions from readers were also encouraged and published.

In the 1820s, changing expectations of the role of women in British society coincided with a marked decrease in the intellectual scope of La Belle Assemblée and its competitors, which increasingly focused on fashion and domestic pursuits.

Until spring 1822, the fashion plates were labeled a month ahead, e.g., the plates published in May 1810 were marked June 1810. Mary Ann Bell was a well known contributor to the fashion content in the publication.

The changes in the early 1820s may have resulted from John Bell's retirement some time in 1821.

Similar magazines
Similarly titled fashion publications included The Penny Belle Assemblée or Maids, Wives and Widows' Gazette of Fashions (1830s), the Weekly Belle Assemblée, and its successor the New Monthly Belle Assemblée (1847–1870).

See also
 Gallery of Fashion
 List of 18th-century British periodicals
 List of 18th-century British periodicals for women
 List of 19th-century British periodicals

Plates from La Belle Assemblée

References

External links

Plates from La Belle Assemblée
La Belle Assemblée Volume III

Fashion magazines published in the United Kingdom
Defunct women's magazines published in the United Kingdom
Magazines established in 1806
Magazines disestablished in 1837
Regency era
Women's fashion magazines
1806 establishments in the United Kingdom
1837 disestablishments in the United Kingdom